Charisma (gastropod) is a genus of sea snails, marine gastropod mollusks in the family Trochidae, the top snails.

Description
A genus related to Liotia, but without a varix to the outer lip. The species are few-whorled and spirally sculptured. Their umbilicus has an internal funicle. The operculum is corneous, concave, multispiral, with a spiral frilled lamella.

Species
 Charisma arenacea (Pritchard, G.B. & J.H. Gatliff, 1902)
 Charisma candida (A. Adams, 1861)
 Charisma carinata (Verco, J.C., 1907)
 Charisma compacta Hedley, C., 1915
 Charisma josephi (Tenison-Woods, J.E., 1877)
 Charisma latebrosa (Hedley, C., 1907)
 Charisma radians (Laseron, 1954)
 Charisma simplex (Laseron, 1954)

References

 Cotton, B.C., 1959. South Australian Mollusca. Archaeogastropoda. Govt. Printer, Adelaide
 Iredale, T. & McMichael, D.F., 1962 [31/Dec/1962]. A reference list of the marine Mollusca of New South Wales. Mem. Aust. Mus., 11:0-0
 Hickman, C.S. & McLean, J.H., 1990 26 November.. Systematic revision and suprageneric classification of trochacean gastropods . Natural History Museum of Los Angeles County, Science Series, 35:1-169
 Wilson, B., 1993. Australian Marine Shells. Prosobranch Gastropods. Odyssey Publishing, Kallaroo, WA

External links
 To ITIS
 To World Register of Marine Species

 
Trochidae
Gastropod genera